Bečic is a village in municipality of Oriovac in the central part of Brod-Posavina County.

References

Populated places in Brod-Posavina County